Filariidae is a family of nematodes belonging to the order Rhabditida.

Genera

References

Nematodes